John Treadwell Nichols (born July 23, 1940 in Berkeley, California) is an American novelist. Nichols graduated from Hamilton College in 1962.

Novels
Nichols is the author of the "New Mexico trilogy", a series about the complex relationship among history, race and ethnicity, and land and water rights in the fictional town of Chamisaville, New Mexico. The trilogy consists of The Milagro Beanfield War (which was adapted into a movie of the same title directed by Robert Redford), The Magic Journey, and The Nirvana Blues.

Two of his other novels have been made into films. The Wizard of Loneliness was published in 1966, and the film version with Lukas Haas was made in 1988. Another movie adaptation was of The Sterile Cuckoo, published in 1965 and then adapted for a film by Alan J. Pakula in 1969. He also had a hand, uncredited due to a decision in an arbitration with the Writers Guild, in the Oscar-winning Best Adapted Screenplay for Costa-Gavras' 1982 film Missing.

Non-fiction
Nichols also has written non-fiction, including the trilogy If Mountains Die, The Last Beautiful Days of Autumn and On the Mesa. Nichols has lived in Taos, New Mexico for many years. He is the subject of a documentary The Milagro Man: The Irrepressible Multicultural Life and Literary Times of John Nichols, which premiered at the 2012 Albuquerque Film Festival.

Photography
Nichols also is a photographer.  Many of his photographs appear in his book On the Mesa, among others.  He also participated as an instructor in fine art photographic workshops, most notably with the Los Angeles photographer Ray McSavaney. He is long-time political activist for progressive and especially environmental causes.

Personal life
He is the grandson of ichthyologist John Treadwell Nichols and a first cousin of Massachusetts politician William Weld.

Bibliography
Novels
 
 
 New Mexico Trilogy
 
 
 
 
 
 
 
 
 
 
 
 

Non-fiction
 Non-fiction trilogy
 
 
 
 
 
 
 
 I Got Mine: Confessions of a Midlist Writer. University of Mexico Press. 2022

References

External links

John Nichols Interview for New Mexico in Focus New Mexico PBS, raw footage
Collection: John Nichols Papers, University of New Mexico, University Libraries, Center for Southwest Research
John Nichols, Writing the Southwest, University of New Mexico

1940 births
Living people
20th-century American novelists
21st-century American novelists
American male novelists
American socialists
Hamilton College (New York) alumni
Writers from Berkeley, California
Writers from Taos, New Mexico
20th-century American male writers
21st-century American male writers
Loomis Chaffee School alumni